The White U House was a building in Nakano, Tokyo, Japan designed by Toyo Ito in 1976. The building was demolished in 1997.

Ito designed the building as a house for his older sister following the loss of her husband.

The house is one of Ito's most seminal projects.

References 

Toyo Ito buildings
Residential buildings in Tokyo
Houses completed in 1976
1976 establishments in Japan
Nakano, Tokyo
Buildings and structures demolished in 1997
1997 disestablishments in Japan
Houses in Japan